The Americas Zone was one of the three regional zones of the 1978 Davis Cup.

10 teams entered the Americas Zone in total, with 3 teams entering the North & Central America Zone and 8 teams entering the South America Zone. The winner of each sub-zone advanced to the Americas Inter-Zonal Final, with the winner going on to compete in the Inter-Zonal Zone against the winners of the Eastern Zone and Europe Zone.

The United States defeated South Africa in the North & Central America Zone final, and Chile defeated Argentina in the South America Zone final. In the Americas Inter-Zonal Final the United States defeated Chile and progressed to the Inter-Zonal Zone.

The North & Central America Zone was marked by a number of incidents related to the continued presence of South Africa team. Canada, Mexico, Venezuela, and the Caribbean/West Indies teams all withdrew from the competition, and large scale protests accompanied the final between the United States and South Africa at Vanderbilt University in Nashville, Tennessee. In an effort to appease its critics, South Africa named Peter Lamb as one of the six members of its team, as its first-ever "coloured" player.  However, Lamb did not play, and his inclusion in the squad was derided as tokenism.  Crowds of up to 5000 turned out in protest.

North & Central America Zone

Draw

Semifinals
South Africa vs. Colombia

Final
United States vs. South Africa

South America Zone

Preliminary rounds

Draw

First round
Peru vs. Bolivia

Uruguay vs. Ecuador

Qualifying round
Chile vs. Bolivia

Uruguay vs. Brazil

Main draw

Draw

Semifinals
Chile vs. Uruguay

Final
Chile vs. Argentina

Americas Inter-Zonal Final
Chile vs. United States

References

External links
Davis Cup official website

Davis Cup Americas Zone
Americas
Davis Cup
Davis Cup
Davis Cup